John Nyawanga is a Kenyan former international footballer who played as a striker.

Nyawanga earned 80 caps for Kenya, scoring 17 goals, and captained Kenya at the 1972 Africa Cup of Nations, their first appearance at the tournament. During his club career, he played for Abaluhya United and Kenya Breweries. He worked at a sports goods shop in Nairobi following his retirement.

References

Year of birth missing (living people)
Living people
Kenyan footballers
Kenya international footballers
Place of birth missing (living people)
Association football forwards
A.F.C. Leopards players
Tusker F.C. players
1972 African Cup of Nations players